"Anthem of Our Dying Day" is the second single from Story of the Year's debut album, Page Avenue. "Anthem of Our Dying Day" was released to radio on April 13, 2004. The song reached number 10 on the Modern Rock Tracks. A music video was also filmed for the song and directed by Mr. Hahn of Linkin Park.

Track listing

Chart position

References

2004 singles
Story of the Year songs
Rock ballads
Maverick Records singles
2003 songs
Song recordings produced by John Feldmann